The Best American Poetry 2007, a volume in The Best American Poetry series, was edited by poet Heather McHugh, guest editor, who made the final selections, and David Lehman, the general editor for the series.

This book is the 20th volume in the most popular annual poetry anthology in the United States. Along with popular poets who have often appeared in previous editions, such as Billy Collins, Louise Gluck and Galway Kinnell, the book includes poets of "off-center traditions" such as Rae Armantrout and Christian Bok. Some of McHugh's selections from newer poets "tend toward the experimental," according to a review in Publishers Weekly, which pointed to poems from Ben Lerner and Danielle Pafunda as evidence of this. Publishers Weekly called it a "riskier than usual volume."

Richard Wakefield, reviewing the volume in The Seattle Times, wrote that McHugh's selections were "as eccentric, sometimes as unabashedly goofy, as any in the series' two decades," but among them were a couple of dozen "very fine" poems. Wakefield in particular praised the poems by Carmine Starnino and Brad Leithauser, but called the Nicky Beer selection merely "clever prose arranged as questions and answers," and that poem's inclusion probably due to a common "weakness" among poets for wordplay. McHugh's essay introducing the volume was briefer than those of most of her predecessors, according to Wakefield, but was itself almost worth the cost of the book and contains some phrasing "as good as anything in the volume."

In her review of the book for The Tampa Tribune, Karen Haymon wrote that the poems by established poets generally outshone the work of the lesser-known writers, with plenty of poems "good and worth reading" by established names such as Billy Collins, Donald Hall, and Robert Hass. However, Haymon called a poem by Brian Turner, an Iraq veteran, a pleasant discovery.

Poets and poems included
Listed in alphabetical order by author's name:

Publishing information
The book is published by Scribner.

224 pages

Hardcover: 

Paperback:

See also
 2007 in poetry

Notes

External links
  Web page for the book

Best American Poetry series
2007 poetry books
Poetry
American poetry anthologies